Regent's Park and Kensington North was a constituency in Central and West London represented in the House of Commons of the Parliament of the United Kingdom.   It elected one Member of Parliament (MP) by the first past the post system of election.

History
The constituency was created in 1997 from parts of the former seats of Westminster North and Kensington. It was abolished at the 2010 general election.

With its stark contrasts between prosperity and deprivation, the constituency should have been a highly competitive marginal between the Conservative Party and Labour Party in an even year, although for the three general elections of its existence it was won firmly by Labour. Before its creation it was considered a constituency likely to produce low swings which would be won on differential turnout, similar to its predecessor seats. However, in the political climate of the late 1990s and early 2000s, in which Tony Blair's New Labour dominated, this proved not to be the case.

Boundaries 
The constituency covered the areas of St John's Wood, Maida Vale, the Harrow Road, Westbourne Green, Maida Hill, Little Venice, parts of Queen's Park, parts of Ladbroke Grove and Notting Hill, as well as North Kensington.

The electoral wards of the constituency were:

From the Royal Borough of Kensington and Chelsea: Avondale; Colville; Golborne; Kelfield; St Charles.
Following boundary changes for local elections in 2002, Avondale and Kelfield wards were combined to create Notting Barns.

From the City of Westminster: Church Street; Hamilton Terrace; Harrow Road; Little Venice; Lords; Maida Vale; Queen's Park; Regent's Park; Westbourne.

In 2002, a Local Government Boundary Commission for England review abolished the Hamilton Terrace and Lords wards, with the areas absorbed by Regent's Park and the new ward of Abbey Road.

For the 2005 general election, the electoral wards used in this constituency were Bayswater (part), Bryanston and Dorset Square (part), Colville, Church Street, Golborne, Harrow Road, Little Venice, Maida Vale, Norland (part), Notting Barns, Queen's Park, Regent's Park, St Charles and Westbourne.

Despite the name, the seat did not include the area in the Regent's Park ward of the London Borough of Camden.

Abolition
The Boundary Commission proposed that the City of Westminster, together with the sparsely populated City of London, receive two seats in its own right from the 2010 general election.  As a result, Regent's Park and Kensington North was abolished, with most of the Westminster section going into a reformed Westminster North seat and the Kensington and Chelsea section going into a reformed Kensington seat, Chelsea being transferred to the new Chelsea and Fulham seat. The remainder of Westminster (chiefly the part taken from Bryanston and Dorset Square) was combined with the City of London in the Cities of London and Westminster seat. The part of Bayswater ward used in the latter, together with Lancaster Gate, were moved into Westminster North. These changes were implemented in 2010.

Members of Parliament

Elections

Elections in the 2000s

Elections in the 1990s

See also 
 List of parliamentary constituencies in London

References

 Regent's Park and Kensington North Parliamentary Constituency borough information by the Government Office for London
The Almanac of British Politics by Robert Waller, Byron Criddle
Labour Party in Westminster, Regent's Park and Kensington North

Politics of the Royal Borough of Kensington and Chelsea
Constituencies of the Parliament of the United Kingdom established in 1997
Constituencies of the Parliament of the United Kingdom disestablished in 2010
Parliamentary constituencies in London (historic)